Bobr may refer to:

Bobr (Berezina), a river in Belarus, tributary of the Berezina
Bóbr, a river in the Czech Republic and the southwest of Poland, tributary of the Oder
Bobr Air Base in Belarus
, an urban settlement in Belarus
, Polish  armored reconnaissance vehicle
(pl), a Polish minesweeper, built in 1958
(ru)
(ru), later in Estonian navy as EML Lembit (1918}
Bóbr (surname)

See also

Bober (disambiguation)